Abbeville Municipal Airport  is a city-owned, public-use airport located three nautical miles (6 km) north of the central business district of Abbeville, a city in Henry County, Alabama, United States. It is the only airport that serves the city of Abbeville.

This airport is included in the FAA's National Plan of Integrated Airport Systems for 2011–2015 and 2009–2013, both of which categorized it as a general aviation facility.

History 
Abbeville Municipal Airport was officially activated by the FAA in August 1959.

Facilities and aircraft 
Abbeville Municipal Airport covers an area of 36 acres (15 ha) at an elevation of 468 feet (143 m) above mean sea level. It has one runway designated 17/35 with an asphalt surface measuring 2,915 by 80 feet (888 x 24 m). For the 12-month period ending November 11, 2009, the airport had 1,600 aircraft operations, an average of 133 per month: 75% military and 25% general aviation.

See also
 List of airports in Alabama

References

External links 
 Aerial image as of January 1992 from USGS The National Map
 

Airports in Alabama
Transportation buildings and structures in Henry County, Alabama